Huanghua is a county-level city located in the Bohai Gulf coastal region of Hebei province, China. It is under the jurisdiction of the prefecture-level city of Cangzhou.

Huanghua is named after Chinese Communist revolutionary Huang Hua. Previously it was known as Xinqing County.

Huanghua has a seaport, Huanghua Port. It is a stop on the Jinshan Expressway that connects Tianjin with Shantou, Guangdong.

Administrative divisions

Subdistricts:
Huazhong Subdistrict, Huadong Subdistrict, Huaxi Subdistrict

Towns:
Huanghua Town, Nanpaihe, Jiucheng, Lüqiao

Townships:
Guanzhuang Township, Changguo Township, Qijiawu Township, Tengzhuangzi Township, Yang'erzhuang Hui Ethnic Township, Xincun Hui Ethnic Township, Yangsanmu Hui Ethnic Township

Climate
Huanghua has a four-season, monsoon-influencedhumid continental climate  (Köppen Dwa), with cold, dry winters, and hot, humid summers. Close to 60% of the annual rainfall of  occurs in July and August alone.

References

External links 
 Huanghua Government Website

 
County-level cities in Hebei
Cangzhou